Abdelhafid of Morocco or Moulay Abdelhafid (24 February 1875 – 4 April 1937) was the Sultan of Morocco from 1908 to 1912 and a member of the Alaouite Dynasty. His younger brother, Abdelaziz of Morocco, preceded him. While Mulai Abdelhafid initially opposed his brother for giving some concessions to foreign powers, he himself became increasingly backed by the French and finally signed the protectorate treaty giving de facto control of the country to France.

Hafidiya 

After his brother Abdelaziz appointed him as Khalifa of Marrakesh, Abdelhafid sought to have him overthrown by fomenting distrust over Abdelaziz's European ties. Abdelhafid was aided by Madani al-Glaoui, older brother of T'hami, one of the Caids of the Atlas. He was assisted in the training of his troops by Andrew Belton (Kaid), a British officer and veteran of the Second Boer War. In February 1908, Abdelhafid was proclaimed the Sultan of Fes. For a brief period, Abdelaziz reigned from Rabat while Abdelhafid reigned in Marrakesh and Fes. In August 1908 Abdelaziz was defeated in battle. In 1909, Abdelhafid became the recognized leader of Morocco.

Writing contemporaneously about his rule in 1909, George Frederick Andrews says that Abdelhafid "must play a very shrewd game. To maintain his authority over the tribes he must continue to appear decidedly anti-European in his feelings and his policy. On the other hand he must have money and the money must come from Europe. Also he knows that Morocco must submit to such reforms as have been decreed by the conference of the powers."

Despotism 
Muhammad al-Kattani, the influential Sufi poet and activist of Fes, was captured, tortured, and beaten to death in front of his wives and children in 1909.

In 1910, Lalla Batoul, a Fesi aristocrat and the wife of a former governor of Fes and supporter of Abdelaziz, was tortured. She was chained to the wall in a crucifixion position, completely naked with her breasts seized in a vice, and whipped and interrogated about the whereabouts of her husband's fortune under the direct supervision of Abdelhafid. Walter Burton Harris reported on the incident in an article published in the Times of Morocco.

Treaty of Fes, abdication, retirement and death

In 1911, rebellion broke out against the Sultan. This led to the Agadir Crisis, also known as the Second Moroccan Crisis. These events led Abdelhafid to sign the Treaty of Fez on 30 March 1912, which made Morocco a French protectorate. 

A few months later, Resident-General Hubert Lyautey persuaded Abdel Hafid to abdicate against the payment of a massive pension, part of which was used to build the opulent Abdelhafid Palace in Tangier, completed in 1914. His brother Yusef was proclaimed Sultan by the French administration on 13 August 1912. Yusef was chosen by dignitaries of Rabat, to which he soon relocated to escape the instability in Fez. Abdel Hafid signed his abdication while already on the quay in Rabat, with the ship that would take him to France waiting. During his extended visit in France, he received a great deal of attention from the press. He later returned to Morocco to live in Tangier.

Abd al-Hafid died in Enghien-les-Bains, France, on 4 April 1937. His body was transported to Fez, where he was buried in the royal mausoleum of the Moulay Abdallah Mosque.

Marriages and children 
By marriage Moulay Abd al-Hafid is so far recorded to have had six children. He wedded three women:

 Lalla Rabia bint Madani el Glaoui, they married around 1905 and she died in 1924. together they had two sons and two daughters, among them:
 Moulay Idriss (b. 1905).
 Lalla Amina, in her first marriage she married Moulay Mohammed al-Hassan ben Yusef and in her second marriage she wedded Moulay Lafchar el Alaoui. 
 Lalla Rabaha bint Mohammed el Zayyani, they married in December 1907. Whether they issued children is not stated. 
 Lalla Ruqiya bint Mohammed al-Moqri, they married in July 1910. Together they had:
 Moulay Slimane Hafidi;
 Sidi Mohammed (b. 1917).

Honors

 Grand Cross of the Legion d'Honneur of France (1909)

See also

 List of Kings of Morocco
 History of Morocco

References

External links
 Morocco Alaoui dynasty
 History of Morocco
 

1875 births
1937 deaths
19th-century Arabs
19th-century Moroccan people
'Alawi dynasty
Monarchs who abdicated
Moroccan people of Arab descent
People from Fez, Morocco
People from Marrakesh
Sultans of Morocco